The 1st Lumières Awards ceremony, presented by the Académie des Lumières, was held on 29 January 1996. The ceremony was chaired by Isabella Rossellini. La Haine won two awards including Best Film and Best Director.

Winners

See also
 21st César Awards

References

External links
 
 
 1st Lumières Awards at AlloCiné

Lumières Awards
Lumières
Lumières